Glaucocharis tripunctata is a moth in the family Crambidae. It was described by Frederic Moore in 1888. It is found in India (Darjeeling, Uttar Pradesh, Assam) and Nepal.

Subspecies
Glaucocharis tripunctata tripunctata (India)
Glaucocharis tripunctata grahami Gaskin in Wang, Gaskin & Sung, 1988 (India: Uttar Pradesh)
Glaucocharis tripunctata pallescens Gaskin in Wang, Gaskin & Sung, 1988 (Nepal)

References

Diptychophorini
Moths described in 1888